Cheung Kai Tung (born 17 March 1983) is a fencer from Hong Kong, China who won a bronze medal at the 2006 Asian Games in the men's foil team competition.

References

1983 births
Living people
Hong Kong male foil fencers
Place of birth missing (living people)
Asian Games medalists in fencing
Fencers at the 2006 Asian Games
Asian Games bronze medalists for Hong Kong
Medalists at the 2006 Asian Games
21st-century Hong Kong people